South Side Market Building (or South Side Market House) is a historic market house at 12th and Bingham Streets in the South Side Flats neighborhood of Pittsburgh, Pennsylvania.

It was built in 1915, and added to the  National Register of Historic Places in 1976.

The original market house on this spot was built in 1893, but burned around 1914 and was rebuilt in 1915.  Architect: Charles Bickel.  According to James D. Van Trump and Arthur P. Ziegler, Jr., "It is one of the last two market houses extant in Pittsburgh; the other is the East Liberty Market.  The present building opened in 1893.  It burned in 1914 (?) and was rebuilt probably on the old lines and opened in 1915.  According to Walter C. Kidney, "When it was rebuilt in 1915 after a fire, the towers came off, the gable roof was brought down to the eaves on both fronts, and a well-scaled stone cartouche was set into the south front memorializing the new work.  This cartouche is the building's one decoration today, set off by swags and surmounted by a bull's head.  The Romanesque walls otherwise survive largely as built, industrial rather than civic architecture."

References

Commercial buildings on the National Register of Historic Places in Pennsylvania
Italianate architecture in Pennsylvania
Commercial buildings completed in 1915
Commercial buildings in Pittsburgh
City of Pittsburgh historic designations
Pittsburgh History & Landmarks Foundation Historic Landmarks
National Register of Historic Places in Pittsburgh